United States gubernatorial elections were held in 1913, in four states. Massachusetts at this time held gubernatorial elections every year, which it would abandon in 1920. New Jersey at this time held gubernatorial elections every 3 years, which it would abandon in 1949. Virginia holds its gubernatorial elections in odd numbered years, every 4 years, following the United States presidential election year.

In Arkansas, a special election was held in July 1913 following the resignation of Joseph T. Robinson in March 1913 to take a seat in the United States Senate.

Results

References

Notes 

 
November 1913 events